Futile medical care is the continued provision of medical care or treatment to a patient when there is no reasonable hope of a cure or benefit.

Some proponents of evidence-based medicine suggest discontinuing the use of any treatment that has not been shown to provide a measurable benefit. Futile care discontinuation is distinct from euthanasia because euthanasia involves active intervention to end life, while withholding futile medical care does not encourage or hasten the natural onset of death.

Definition 
In the broadest sense, futile care is care that does not benefit the patient as a whole, including physical, spiritual, or other benefits. This may be interpreted differently in various legal, ethical, or religious contexts. Clinicians and health care providers may need to rely on a more narrow definition of futile care in order to make decisions about a patient's health care, and this definition often centers around an assessment of the likelihood that a patient could physically recover as a result of treatment, or the likelihood of such treatment to relieve a patient's suffering. Examples of futile care may be a surgeon operating on a terminal cancer patient even when the surgery will not alleviate suffering; or doctors keeping a brain-dead person on life-support machines for reasons other than to procure their organs for donation. It is a sensitive area that often causes conflicts among medical practitioners and patients or kin.

Many controversies surrounding the concept of futile care center around how futility is assessed differently in specific situations rather than on arguments in favor of providing futile care per se. It is difficult to determine when a particular course of action may fall under the definition of futile medical care, because of the difficulty in defining the point at which there is no further benefit to intervention in each case. For instance, a cancer patient may be willing to undergo yet more chemotherapy with a very expensive medication for the benefit of a few weeks of life, while medical staff, insurance company staff, and close relatives may believe this is a futile course of care.

A 2010 survey of more than 10,000 physicians in the United States found respondents divided on the issue of recommending or giving "life-sustaining therapy when [they] judged that it was futile", with 23.6% saying they would do so, 37% saying they would not, and 39.4% selecting "It depends".

Arguments against providing futile medical care

Arguments against providing futile care include potential harm to patients, family members, or caregivers with little or no likely benefits, and the diversion of resources to support the futile care of patients when resources could be used to provide care to patients that could respond to care.

Futile care does not offer benefits to the patient as a whole, and at the same time the physical, emotional, spiritual, economic, or ethical hardship and harm caused by futile care to the patient or to family members may be significant.

While futile care does not benefit patients, it may cost providers, the state, and patient families significant money and resources. In some cases, futile care involves the expenditure of resources that could be used by other patients with a good likelihood of achieving a positive outcome. For instance, in the case of Baby K, attempts to transfer the infant to other centers were unsuccessful because there were no unoccupied pediatric ICU beds in the region. Many critics of that case insist that the medical expenses used to keep the anencephalic child on life support for over two years could have been better spent on awareness and prevention efforts for her condition.

Issues in futile care considerations

The issue of futile care in clinical medicine generally involves two questions. The first concerns the identification of those clinical scenarios where the care would be futile. The second concerns the range of ethical options when care is determined to be futile.

Assessment of futility in a clinical context

Clinical scenarios vary in degrees and manners of futility. While scenarios like providing ICU care to the brain-dead patient or the anencephalic patient when organ harvesting is not possible or practical are easily identifiable as futile, many other situations are less clear.

A study in the United Kingdom with more than 180,000 patients aimed to define a timeframe for quantitative futility in emergency laparotomy and investigate predictors of futility using the United Kingdom National Emergency Laparotomy Audit (NELA) database. A two-stage methodology was used; stage one defined a timeframe for futility using an online survey and steering group discussion; stage two applied this definition to patients enrolled in NELA December 2013–December 2020 for analysis. Futility was defined as all-cause mortality within 3 days of emergency laparotomy. Results showed that quantitative futility occurred in 4% of patients (7442/180,987) and median age was 74 years. Significant predictors of futility included age, arterial lactate and cardiorespiratory co-morbidity. Frailty was associated with a 38% increased risk of early mortality and surgery for intestinal ischaemia was associated with a two times greater chance of futile surgery. These findings suggest that quantitative futility after emergency laparotomy is associated with quantifiable risk factors available to decision-makers preoperatively and should be incorporated into shared decision-making discussions with extremely high-risk patients.

Over the last four decades, the clinical community has improved the quality of prognostic efforts. As a result, simple but imprecise rules of thumb like "percent mortality = age + percent burn" to judge the futility of burn cases involving elderly patients, have now given way to sophisticated algorithms based on multiple linear regression and other advanced statistical techniques. These are complex clinical algorithms that have been scientifically validated and have considerable clinical predictive value, particularly in the case of patients with severe burns. Such algorithms may provide high-quality prognostic information to aid patients and families in making difficult decisions, and have the potential to be used to guide resource allocation. 

These prognostic algorithms estimate the probability of the patient surviving. In a study of patients so severely burned that survival was clinically unprecedented, during the initial lucid period (before sepsis and other complications set in) patients were told that survival was extremely unlikely (i.e., that death was essentially inevitable) and were asked to choose between palliative care and aggressive clinical measures. Most chose aggressive clinical measures, which may suggest that the will to live in patients can be very strong even situations deemed hopeless by the clinician. 

Another practical clinical example that often occurs in large hospitals is the decision about whether or not to continue resuscitation when the resuscitation efforts following an in-hospital cardiac arrest have been prolonged. A 1999 study in the Journal of the American Medical Association has validated an algorithm developed for these purposes.

As medical care improves and affects more and more chronic conditions, questions of futility have continued to arise. A relatively recent response to this difficulty in the United States is the introduction of the hospice concept, in which palliative care is initiated for someone thought to be within about six months of death. Numerous social and practical barriers exist that complicate the issue of initiating hospice status for someone unlikely to recover.

Options for futile care and futile care as a commodity 

Another issue in futile care theory concerns the range of ethical options when care is determined to be futile. Some people argue that futile clinical care should be a market commodity that should be able to be purchased just like cruise vacations or luxury automobiles, as long as the purchaser of the clinical services has the necessary funds and as long as other patients are not being denied access to clinical resources as a result. In this model, Baby K would be able to get ICU care (primarily ventilatory care) until funding vanished. With rising medical care costs and an increase in extremely expensive new anti-cancer medications, the similar issues of equity often arise in treatment of end-stage cancer.

See also
Texas Futile Care Law
Right to die

References

External links
Medical Futility Blog

Evidence-based medicine
Palliative care